Golden Valley is a western and first-ring suburb of Minneapolis in Hennepin County, Minnesota, United States. The city is mostly residential and is bordered by U.S. Highway 12 (Interstate 394). Over 15% of the city is parks or nature reserves. The Floyd B. Olson Memorial Highway also runs through the heart of the city providing a direct route to the Minneapolis industrial district.

Golden Valley is the main corporate headquarters of General Mills, a major flour milling and food products company originally located in Minneapolis. It is also the site of the U.S. headquarters of Pentair and local NBC affiliate KARE. The city was also home to the former Minneapolis-Honeywell headquarters, which is now the Resideo Technologies corporate offices.

The city's population was 22,552 at the 2020 census.

History
Tribes of Chippewa and Sioux had encampments on nearby Medicine Lake.  The first white settlers arrived in the early 1850s.  Golden Valley was incorporated December 17, 1886.  In the early twentieth century, it was mostly a farming community.

Geography

The 45th parallel north runs through Golden Valley, coinciding approximately with Duluth Street.

Interstate 394, U.S. Highway 169, and Minnesota State Highways 55 and 100 are four of the main routes in the area.

Education

Most children who live in Golden Valley attend the Robbinsdale School District or the Hopkins School District, as all of the territory of the city belongs to one or the other school district. Some students attend public schools in other school districts chosen by their families under Minnesota's open enrollment statute.

Golden Valley High School was founded in 1957, and the adjacent Golden Valley Middle School was opened in 1964, and were closed in the early 1980s after the Golden Valley School District merged with the Hopkins School District. Carl Sandburg Junior High School opened in 1959. In 1988, it became Sandburg Middle School. In 1981, the Breck School, a private 
Episcopal school, purchased the former Golden Valley High School and Middle School property and moved from Minneapolis to the campus of the former Golden Valley schools.

King of Grace Lutheran School is a Christian preschool, elementary school, and middle school of the Evangelical Lutheran Synod in Golden Valley.

There is also a private elementary Catholic School named Good Shepherd Catholic School. Its name was changed in 2006 from the former Parkvalley Catholic.

What is currently the site of the Perpich Center for Arts Education was originally the Golden Valley Lutheran College, which closed in 1985.

Economy

Major employers in the city include:
Tennant
General Mills
Pentair
KARE, NBC television affiliate for the Twin Cities
Minnesota United FC – headquarters for the Major League Soccer franchise
Bluestone Garden
Room & Board
Honeywell
UnitedHealth Group
USFamily.net

Even though the population of Golden Valley is around 20,000, more than 30,000 people work in Golden Valley. This is because of the presence of large employers including General Mills, Honeywell, and Pentair.

Top employers
According to Golden Valley's 2010 Comprehensive Annual Financial Report, the top employers in the city were:

Demographics

2010 census
As of the census of 2010, there were 20,371 people, 8,816 households, and 5,417 families living in the city. The racial makeup of the city was 85.4% White, 7.1% African American, 0.4% Native American, 3.5% Asian, 0.9% from other races, and 2.7% from two or more races. Hispanic or Latino of any race were 2.6% of the population.

There were 8,816 households, of which 25.6% had children under the age of 18 living with them, 50.3% were married couples living together, 8.1% had a female householder with no husband present, 3.1% had a male householder with no wife present, and 38.6% were non-families. 30.4% of all households were made up of individuals, and 14.5% had someone living alone who was 65 years of age or older. The average household size was 2.26 and the average family size was 2.84.

The median age in the city was 45.7 years. 19.9% of residents were under the age of 18; 5.1% were between the ages of 18 and 24; 23.7% were from 25 to 44; 30.9% were from 45 to 64; and 20.3% were 65 years of age or older. The gender makeup of the city was 48.6% male and 51.4% female.

2000 census
As of the census of 2000, there were 20,281 people, 8,449 households, and 5,508 families living in the city. The racial makeup of the city was 91.07% White, 3.59% African American, 0.29% Native American, 2.87% Asian, 0.03% Pacific Islander, 0.55% from other races, and 1.61% from two or more races. Hispanic or Latino of any race were 1.76% of the population.

There were 8,449 households, out of which 26.5% had children under the age of 18 living with them, 55.5% were married couples living together, 7.5% had a female householder with no husband present, and 34.8% were non-families. 27.6% of all households were made up of individuals, and 12.1% had someone living alone who was 65 years of age or older. The average household size was 2.31 and the average family size was 2.84.

In the city, the population was spread out, with 20.6% under the age of 18, 5.0% from 18 to 24, 28.2% from 25 to 44, 26.5% from 45 to 64, and 19.6% who were 65 years of age or older. The median age was 43 years. For every 100 females, there were 93.7 males. For every 100 females age 18 and over, there were 89.9 males.

The median income for a household in the city was $62,063, and the median income for a family was $75,899 (these figures had risen to $77,976 and $87,828 respectively as of a 2007 estimate). Males had a median income of $49,890 versus $35,967 for females. The per capita income for the city was $34,094. About 0.8% of families and 3.0% of the population were below the poverty line, including 2.2% of those under age 18 and 3.6% of those age 65 or over.

Government
Golden Valley is a statutory city, where the mayor votes with the city council. Golden Valley operates under the council–manager form of government. The city council sets the policy and overall direction for the city, and appoints a city manager to serve as administrator. The city manager directs city staff in carrying out council decisions and providing services.

The mayor serves a four-year term.  There are four council members serving staggered four-year terms. Two council seats are up for election every two years, in odd-numbered years. The council members run citywide; there are no wards. The current mayor is Shep Harris. The current city council includes Maurice Harris, Denise La Mere-Anderson, Gillian Rosenquist and Kimberly Sanberg.

Politics
Golden Valley is located in Minnesota's 5th congressional district, represented in the U.S. House of Representatives by Minneapolis activist and organizer Ilhan Omar, a Democrat.  The city is split between two state legislative districts: 46A, represented by Representative Ryan Winkler and Senator Ron Latz, and 45B, represented by Representative Mark Freiberg and Senator Ann Rest.  All four are Democrats.

Notable people

John R. Arlandson, Minnesota state legislator and lawyer
Tom Barnard; KQRS radio morning show host and voice-over artist
Scott Z. Burns; screenwriter, producer, director
David King; drummer of The Bad Plus, Happy Apple, and other groups
Jordan Leopold; former player for U.S. Olympic hockey team and the National Hockey League's Minnesota Wild.
Trent Lockett; professional basketball player
Kelly Lynch; actress
Lynne Osterman; Minnesota state legislator
Aaron Sele; former Major League Baseball right-handed pitcher.
Craig Taborn; jazz pianist

References

Further reading

External links

City of Golden Valley — Official Website

Cities in Minnesota
Cities in Hennepin County, Minnesota
Populated places established in 1886
1886 establishments in Minnesota